Binard was a Belgian cyclist. He competed in the men's sprint event at the 1920 Summer Olympics.

References

External links
 

Year of birth missing
Year of death missing
Belgian male cyclists
Olympic cyclists of Belgium
Cyclists at the 1920 Summer Olympics
Place of birth missing